"Mrs. Vandebilt" is a song by the British–American rock band Paul McCartney and Wings from the album Band on the Run. The track was not issued as a single in the UK or US, but was a single in Continental Europe and Australia.

Writing and recording
The opening lines of the song are taken from the catchphrase of English music hall performer Charlie Chester. Chester's catchphrase was "Down in the jungle living in a tent, better than a bungalow, no rent"; the lyrics subsequently changed to "Down in the jungle living in a tent, You don't use money you don't pay rent".

Howie Casey is featured with a saxophone solo.

The song was recorded during the album sessions in Lagos, Nigeria. The studio suffered a power outage during the session, but the recording continued with backup generators. Additional overdubs were later done in London.

The forced laughter that closed "Mrs. Vandebilt" was influenced by Charlie Chester's effects on his studio audience. Wings added more laughter in London's AIR Studios after returning from Lagos, Nigeria. McCartney recalled: "The laughing? It started off in Africa. We were doing sort of daft laughs at the end. When we got back we eventually overdubbed this crowd of people who were laughing. It was great listening to the tapes, trying to select the little bit of laughter that we would use. Most of it was us, but we need a little bit to cushion it up. It was great listening to a roomful of people laughing in stereo. They were getting into all these laughing bits, and we were on the floor."

Live performances
McCartney had not played the song live until a free concert on 14 June 2008 in Kyiv, Ukraine, on account of it receiving the most requests in a web poll. McCartney played the song in his concert for Quebec City, and then at Hayarkon Park in Tel Aviv, Israel, on 25 September 2008, his first show in Israel. It became a fixture in his setlist, as he also performed the song in Halifax, the first show of his 2009 summer tour, as well as in his three July 2009 performances at the Citi Field in New York City. In addition, the song was featured in his Up and Coming Tour in 2010, his On the Run Tour in 2011–12, and most of his Out There! Tour in 2013. It was dropped for the performances in Japan at the end of the latter tour in November 2013.

Use in sampling
 The first sample of the "ho, hey ho" bit actually occurs on the B side of the Band on the Run album itself, at the end of the track "Picasso's Last Words (Drink to Me)".
Various elements from the song, such as the lyrics "ho, hey ho", were sampled in the track "Ho' Is Short for Honey" on 88-Keys' 2008 album, The Death of Adam.
 The song's introduction is also sampled in a Big Boi remix titled "Mrs. Vandebilt Told Me", released online in 2014.

Personnel
Paul McCartney – lead vocals, bass guitar, drums, guitar
Linda McCartney – backing vocals, electric piano
Denny Laine – guitar, backing vocals
Howie Casey – saxophone

References

1973 songs
1974 singles
Apple Records singles
Music published by MPL Music Publishing
Paul McCartney songs
Song recordings produced by Paul McCartney
Songs written by Linda McCartney
Songs written by Paul McCartney
Paul McCartney and Wings songs